William J. Sweeney (1858 – August 2, 1903) was a professional baseball pitcher in 1882 and 1884. Sweeney was born and died in Philadelphia, Pennsylvania.

In 1884, Sweeney led the Union Association in wins with 40.

References

Sources

1858 births
1903 deaths
19th-century baseball players
Major League Baseball pitchers
Baseball players from Philadelphia
Baltimore Monumentals players
Philadelphia Athletics (AA) players
San Francisco Californias players
San Francisco Athletics players
Peoria Reds players
Cleveland Forest Cities players
Elmira Colonels players
Oswego Sweegs players
Oswego Starchboxes players
Reading (minor league baseball) players